Mary Katharine Goddard  (June 16, 1738 – August 12, 1816) was an early American publisher, and the postmaster of the Baltimore Post Office from 1775 to 1789. She was the older sister of William Goddard, also a publisher and printer. She was the second printer to print the Declaration of Independence. Her copy, the Goddard Broadside, was commissioned by Congress in 1777, and was the first to include the names of the signatories.
In 1998, Goddard was inducted into the Maryland Women's Hall of Fame.

Early life 

Mary Katharine Goddard was born in Southern New England in 1738. She was the daughter of Dr. Giles Goddard and Sarah Updike Goddard. Her father was the postmaster of New London, Connecticut. Her brother, William Goddard (1740–1817), was a few years younger and had served an apprenticeship in the printing trade.

Printing career
The Goddard family (Mrs. Goddard, William Goddard and Mary Goddard) had set up a printing press, and were the first to publish a newspaper in Providence, RI, called The Providence Gazette. However, William left Rhode Island to start a newspaper in Philadelphia. William also had been the publisher and printer of a revolutionary publication, the Maryland Journal. Mary Goddard took control of the journal in 1774 while her brother was traveling to promote his Constitutional Post; she continued to publish it throughout the American Revolutionary War until 1784, when her brother forced her to give up the newspaper amid an acrimonious quarrel.

In 1775, Mary Katharine Goddard became postmaster of the Baltimore post office. She also ran a book store and published an almanac in offices located around 250 Market Street (now East Baltimore Street, near South Street). During the American Revolution, Goddard opposed the Stamp Act vehemently, recognizing it would increase the cost of printing.

When on January 18, 1777, the Second Continental Congress moved that the Declaration of Independence be widely distributed, Goddard was one of the first to offer the use of her press. This was in spite of the risks of being associated with what was considered a treasonable document by the British. Her copy, the Goddard Broadside, was the second printed, and the first to contain the typeset names of the signatories, including John Hancock.

Postmaster
Goddard was a successful postmaster for 14 years, from 1775 to 1789. In 1789, however, she was removed from the position by Postmaster General Samuel Osgood despite general protest from the Baltimore community. Osgood asserted that the position required "more traveling ... than a woman could undertake" and appointed a political ally of his to replace her.

Goddard generally did not take part in public controversies, preferring to maintain editorial objectivity; therefore, few articles contain her personal opinions, and her defense was not mounted publicly. On November 12, 1789, over 230 citizens of Baltimore, including more than 200 leading businessmen, presented a petition demanding her reinstatement, which was unsuccessful.

Later life
Goddard remained in Baltimore after her dismissal as Postmaster. She continued to run, until 1809 or 1810, a bookshop that had previously been an adjunct to her printing business, and sold books, stationery, and dry goods. Goddard died August 12, 1816, still beloved by her community, and was buried in the graveyard of the St. Paul’s Parish.

See also
 List of women printers and publishers before 1800
 Pennsylvania Chronicle
 William Goddard (printer)

References

Sources

Further reading 

 For juvenile audience

 

1738 births
1816 deaths
18th-century American businesswomen
18th-century American newspaper publishers (people)
American printers
American publishers (people)
Businesspeople from Baltimore
Maryland postmasters
People of Maryland in the American Revolution
People of colonial Connecticut
People of colonial Maryland
Women in the American Revolution
Women printers